Leopard dace (Rhinichthys falcatus) is a species of ray-finned fish in the genus Rhinichthys. It is found in the United States and Canada, where it inhabits the Fraser and Columbia river drainages in British Columbia, Oregon, Washington, and Idaho.

References 

Rhinichthys
Fish described in 1893